Krishna Byre Gowda (born 4 April 1973) is an Indian politician who served as the Minister of Rural Development, Law and Parliamentary Affairs in the cabinet of H D Kumaraswamy. He was the Minister of Agriculture in the Cabinet of Siddaramaiah from May 2013-2018.  A Member of the Legislative Assembly from the Byatarayanapura Constituency since June 2008, he has served five times as an M.L.A. of Karnataka state, twice from Vemgal in Kolar district from 2003 to 2007, and thrice from the Byatarayanapura Constituency in Bengaluru.

Krishna served as the President of  Karnataka Pradesh Youth Congress between 2007 and 2011, and currently holds the office of General Secretary of the Karnataka Pradesh Congress Committee, since 2012.

Early life
Krishna Byre Gowda was born in Bangalore, Karnataka, to C Byre Gowda and Savithramma. His father  C. Byre Gowda was a senior legislator and Cabinet Minister of Karnataka State, having served as an M.L.A. for five consecutive terms. He served as the Minister Of Agriculture from 1996 to 1999 in the Cabinet of the then Chief  Minister of Karnataka J.H Patel.  Krishna Byre Gowda graduated with a bachelor's degree in Business Management from Christ College, now known as Christ University in Bangalore in 1994. He then graduated with a master's degree (M.A.) in International Affairs from the School of International Service, at American University in Washington, D.C. in 1999. Before earning his M.A. degree, he was a project associate at the Ethiopian Embassy in Washington. He then worked as an agriculturalist at his family-owned farm in the Kolar district between 2000 and 2002.

Career
Krishna Byre Gowda worked as a project associate at Development Alternatives Inc., in Washington, D.C.

DAI's mission is to make a difference in the world by helping societies and economies become more prosperous, fairer and more just, safer, more stable, more efficient, and better governed.

As a project associate at DAI, Krishna worked on several projects to do with development issues and ways to solve them.

Political career

He began his political career in 2003, when his father and All India Progressive Janata Dal leader,  C. Byre Gowda passed away. In October 2003, Krishna contested and won the by-election to fill his late father's legislative assembly seat from Vemgal, Kolar District, to become one of the youngest members of the Karnataka legislature.In April 2004, Krishna Byre Gowda left the All India Progressive Janata Dal political party to join the Indian National Congress and won from Vemgal, Karnataka legislative assembly seat.Krishna Byre Gowda became president of the Karnataka Pradesh Youth Congress Committee in November 2007.

In 2008 Krishna Byre Gowda chose to compete for the urban Byatarayanapura constituency in Bangalore and won the election with 43 percent of the votes, defeating A. Ravi of the Bharatiya Janata Party with a margin of 9,352 votes.Since then Krishna has focused on addressing problems unique to urban residents like bad roads, traffic congestion, drainage problems and uncleared garbage. He has also undertaken various infrastructural development works in Byatarayanapura like developing parks, playgrounds, open gyms and welfare centres through the help of the residents. He has also taken up various initiatives like the construction of auditoriums, toilets, dining halls and additional classrooms in Byatarayanapura government schools with C.S.R assistance from R.V Trust. In an effort to provide affordable housing and title deeds, the construction of 666 houses were approved in Kuvempunagar and around 450 houses were constructed with an approximate budget of 28 crores. Under his leadership, 2200 Hakku Patra titles were provided for beneficiaries in various areas of the Byatarayanapura constituency and 3000 Hakku Patras are in the process to be delivered.

Krishna lost the general election in 2009 for the Bangalore South (Lok Sabha constituency)  in the 2009 Indian general election to Ananth Kumar of BJP.

Krishna Byre Gowda was elected as a Minister of Agriculture in Chief Minister Siddaramaiah's Cabinet on 18 May 2013, at the very young age of 40. During this time he came up with various initiatives to promote the native grain 'Millet' and bring it back into people's diets.  Krishna Byre Gowda believed that in a water deficient state like ours, this crop has a potential to go a long way as it just uses 25% of water to grow in comparison with rice. During his tenure, 20 Millet Melas at various locations across Karnataka were organized and the '1st Organic and Millet International Trade Fair' was organized which attracted over 2 lakh visitors and generated businesses worth 110 Crores. As the Minister of Agriculture, he is also known for connecting 157 agricultural markets through the online market system "e-mandi". The "e-market" concept has now been recognized by the Centre and has led to 38% increase in farmer's income. Between 2013-18, 13 out of 16 lake rejuvenation projects were carried out. He introduced a 'Debt Waiver Scheme' in which debt worth 8165 Crores was waived-off benefitting nearly 22,27,506 farmers across the State. 

He also served as the Minister for Rural Development, Law and Parliament Affairs in the cabinet of H. D. Kumaraswamy between 2018 and 2019.

Personal life 
Krishna Byre Gowda is married to Meenakshi Seshadri, an IT Professional.  A certified scuba diver, Krishna Byre Gowda also has a passion for trekking and hiking. He enjoys reading and is a fitness enthusiast. He is interested in future foods and enjoys sustainable farming at his ancestral farm. Krishna Byre Gowda believes travel expands the mind and cherishes family time.

Positions held
 Cabinet Minister for Rural Development & Panchayat Raj, Government of Karnataka, May 2018 - 2019
 Cabinet Minister for Agriculture, Government of Karnataka, May 2013 - 2018
 President, Karnataka Pradesh Youth Congress, 2007-March 2011
 Member of the Legislative Assembly Byatarayanapura, Bangalore, 2008-Current
 Member of the Legislative Assembly, Vemgal, Kolar District, Karnataka, 2003–2004, 2004–2007
 President, Karnataka Youth Congress Committee. (2007-2011)
 Project Associate, Development Alternatives Inc. Washington, D.C., 2003
 Operated self-owned agricultural farm in Bangalore,  2000–02
 Project Associate, Ethiopian Embassy, Washington, D.C., 1998–99

References

Indian National Congress politicians from Karnataka
Living people
Politicians from Bangalore
Kannada people
1973 births
American University School of International Service alumni
Karnataka MLAs 1999–2004
Karnataka MLAs 2004–2007
Karnataka MLAs 2008–2013
Karnataka MLAs 2013–2018
Karnataka MLAs 2018–2023
Christ University alumni